Naxi District (Tibetan: Jang) is a county-level district of the city of Luzhou, Sichuan Province, China. Formerly a county of Luzhou, Naxi became a district of Luzhou in 1996.

History
Naxi, as a county, has a history of 764 years before it became a district of Luzhou in 1996.

Geography

Climate

Population
As of 2008, Naxi District had a population of over 477,000.

References

External links
  Naxi District Government website

Districts of Sichuan
Luzhou